Elizabeth Margaret Sinclair (3 December 1910 – 25 December 1981) was an Irish communist organiser.

Early life
Born at 44 Hooker Street in Ardoyne, Belfast on 3 December 1910, Sinclair came from a Church of Ireland family and was the daughter of Joseph Sinclair, a sawyer, and Margaret, née Turney, both natives of Belfast. She became a millworker alongside her mother after leaving school at 15. She joined the Revolutionary Workers' Groups (RWG) in 1932. In 1933, she was involved in the Outdoor Relief Strike. She then attended the International Lenin School in Moscow until 1935.

The RWG established the Communist Party of Ireland (CPI) in 1933, and Sinclair became a leading member. In 1940 she was arrested after the CPI paper Unity published an article allegedly sympathetic to the IRA, and she was sentenced to two months' imprisonment in 1941. The same year she became a full-time party worker in Belfast.

War and post-war
When the all-Ireland CPI dissolved in 1941, Sinclair remained an active member of the Communist Party of Northern Ireland (CPNI) and served as its Secretary from 1942 to 1945. She stood for the group in Belfast Cromac at the 1945 Northern Ireland general election, taking almost one third of the votes. In 1947, Sinclair was appointed full-time secretary of the Belfast and District Trades Union Council.

In 1941 Sinclair was arrested and imprisoned after publishing a controversial article in the Red Hand, the official party paper of the Communist Party of Ireland. The Communist Party of Ireland and the Red Hand were worried by the IRA's willingness to explore links with Nazi Germany in order to secure support for a United Ireland, and this was expressed in the Red Hand, questioning if the IRA was turning into a pro-fascist organisation. Republicans sought a chance to respond to this, and the Red Hand allowed Jack Brady to write an article voicing their views. However, the IRA was a proscribed (banned) organisation at the time in the United Kingdom and the Republic of Ireland, and publishing their material was illegal. As part editor of the party, Sinclair was held responsible for the article and later interned, originally for a two-year prison sentence, but this was reduced to two months on appeal. She served her sentence in Armagh Jail, in conditions she described as "medieval".

Sinclair campaigned to restore the American Paul Robeson's passport. Robeson, a noted musician and activist, had supported the Allies during World War 2. However, he was denied a passport by the US State Department due to a long history of supporting left-wing politics and a pro-Soviet Union stance, as well as an anti-colonial attitude. In 1958, Sinclair personally met Robeson when he came to Belfast while on a worldwide tour.

Final stages and death
Sinclair was the Trades Council's representative at the talks which founded the Northern Ireland Civil Rights Association (NICRA) in 1967, and she served as NICRA chair until 1969, when she resigned, claiming it had become dominated by ultra leftists and was worsening sectarian divisions. She stepped down from her trades council post in 1975, and moved to Prague to work for the World Marxist Review, before returning to Belfast. On Christmas Day 1981, Sinclair died from smoke inhalation caused by a fire in her flat in East Belfast.

References

1910 births
1981 deaths
Communist Party of Ireland politicians
Politicians from Belfast
Women activists from Northern Ireland
Communists from Northern Ireland
Accidental deaths in Northern Ireland
Women in the politics of Northern Ireland
International Lenin School alumni
20th-century politicians from Northern Ireland
Deaths by smoke inhalation